Oliver Henry Julius Bertram (26 February 1910 – 13 September 1975) was an English racing driver who held the Brooklands race track record for 2 months 2 days during 1935. He was twice awarded the BRDC Gold Star. He was also a Barrister-At-Law and a Judge Advocate.

Early life and education 

Bertram was the eldest son of Julius Bertram (1866–1944) and Marjorie Sutton (1878–1947). Born in Kensington, London, he was educated at Stowe School, Buckinghamshire, between 1923 and 1927 (under headteacher, John Fergusson Roxburgh), and at Trinity College, Cambridge, where he graduated with an Ordinary BA (a ‘pass degree’).

Legal career 

He was by profession a Barrister at Law practising at 2 Essex Court Chambers, Temple EC4 in London.

Bertram was admitted to the Honourable Society of the Middle Temple on 19 November 1928. He was called to the Bar of England and Wales on 10 May 1933 (Easter Term).

After the Second World War, Oliver resumed his legal career and having served in the Army, he was appointed as a Judge Advocate in 1952, which saw him try cases around Europe.

Racing career 

He started racing at Cambridge in 1929.

Bertram won the Easter Short handicap race in 1935 and with John Cobb took first place in 1937 in the BRDC 500 Kilometres Race – a shortened version of the 500 Miles Race. He was awarded the British Racing Drivers' Club gold star twice – in 1935 and 1938.

Military service 

In 1939, Bertram was a Second lieutenant in the Army Reserve and later that same year, enlisted in the Regular British Army. In 1947, Oliver Bertram, gained the rank of Major.

Personal life 

He married Jennifer Anne Pleasant Clark in Nairobi in 1943. They had 2 children, James Julius Bertram born 24 November 1944 - 19 June 2015 and Janet Lavinia Bertram born 14 August 1946 - 2016.

In later life, he brought a farm in Leicestershire, where he lived with his second wife, Jane (b 1933) who he married in 1974 in Barnstaple, Devon.

Oliver Bertram died after a fall in the snow in Parracombe, Devon in 1975, aged 65.

References

Historic Racing
Motor Sport – Profile of Oliver Bertram 1983 No 6

1910 births
1975 deaths
People educated at Stowe School
BRDC Gold Star winners
English racing drivers